The 434th Field Artillery Brigade is a training/ artillery unit under the United States Army Fires Center of Excellence, a formation under TRADOC. The brigade conducts Basic Combat Training for new enlistees in the U.S. Army.

Mission
434th Field Artillery Brigade conducts reception operations and Basic Combat Training by integrating and transforming civilian volunteers into disciplined, motivated and fit Soldiers in order to provide the Army with competent and confident warfighters willing to live the Army Values.

Organization
The 434th FIeld Artillery Brigade consists of four training battalions, a reception battalion, and a training support detachment:
 Headquarters, Headquarters and Service Detachment
 1st Battalion, 19th Field Artillery Regiment- Inactive (Deactivation 3 Feb 2023)
 1st Battalion, 22nd Field Artillery Regiment- Five basic combat training batteries
 1st Battalion, 31st Field Artillery Regiment- Six basic combat training batteries
 1st Battalion, 40th Field Artillery Regiment- five basic combat training batteries
 1st Battalion, 79th Field Artillery Regiment- five basic combat training batteries
 95th Adjutant General Battalion (Reception)

History
The unit was constituted on 21 November 1942 in the United States Army as Headquarters and Headquarters Company, 1st Tank Destroyer Brigade. It was activated on 24 November 1942 at Camp Hood, Texas. On 22January 1944, the 1st Tank Destroyer Brigade sailed abroad , from New York Port of Embarkation, arrived Greenock, Scotland 28 January 1944. On 11 July 1944 the Brigade landed on Utah Beach, France.

On 2 August 1944 Field Order #10, HQ, VIII Corps designated 1st TD Brigade as HQ for Task Force “A” commanded by Gen Herbert Ernst, consisting of the 15th Cav Group, the 705th TD Battalion, 6th TD Group,509th Engineer Co, and 159th Engineer BN. Their mission was to attack from Avranches to Morlaix, to assist in clearing the Brittany Peninsula and to assist in the capture of Brest. TF A captured 1,679 Enemy Prisoners of War and inflicted heavy damage to enemy personnel and equipment.

On 17 April 1947, the Brigade was re-designated as Headquarters and Headquarters Battery, 434th Field Artillery Group and allotted to the organized reserves. On 1 June 1978, it was re-designated as Headquarters and Headquarters Battery, 434th Field Artillery Brigade. Two active reserve firing battalions reported to the Brigade: the 4/75th Field Artillery and the 7/1st Field Artillery. Each battalion comprised three firing batteries equipped with 8" M110 self-propelled howitzer, which were capable of firing tactical nuclear weapons.

The Brigade was inactivated on 31 December 1990 in Chicago, Illinois. There remains an informal, unincorporated fraternal organization consisting of some of the officers and men who served with the firing battalions of the 434th Field Artillery Brigade. On 17 April 2007, the 434th Field Artillery Brigade was re-activated at Fort Sill, OK as an Army Training Center responsible for the training of the Army's newest volunteers. More information about the current status of 434th Field Artillery Brigade may be found here.

Lineage & Honors

Lineage
 Constituted 21 November 1942 in the Army of the United States as Headquarters and Headquarters Company, 1st Tank Destroyer Brigade
 Activated 24 November 1942 at Camp Hood, Texas
 Inactivated 3 November 1945 in Germany
 Converted and redesignated 17 April 1947 as Headquarters and Headquarters Battery, 434th Field Artillery Group, and allotted to the Organized Reserves
 Activated 7 May 1947 at Kansas City, Missouri 
(Organized Reserves redesignated 25 March 1948 as the Organized Reserve Corps; redesignated 9 July 1952 as the Army Reserve) 
 Redesignated 30 September 1959 as Headquarters and Headquarters Battery, 434th Artillery Group
 Location changed 31 December 1965 to Chicago, Illinois
 Redesignated 15 March 1972 as Headquarters and Headquarters Battery, 434th Field Artillery Group
 Redesignated 1 June 1978 as Headquarters and Headquarters Battery, 434th Field Artillery Brigade
 Inactivated 31 December 1990 at Chicago, Illinois
 Transferred 9 November 2006 to the United States Army Training and Doctrine Command
 Headquarters activated 17 April 2007 at Fort Sill, Oklahoma

Campaign Participation Credit
World War II: Normandy; Northern France; Rhineland; Ardennes-Alsace; Central Europe

Decorations
None

References

Training brigades of the United States Army
Field artillery brigades of the United States Army